Max Pollikoff (1904 - 1984) was an American classical music violinist who created the Music in Our Time Series at the 92nd Street Y in New York City. The Series commissioned and premiered hundreds of new works. In 1923, when Pollikoff was 19, he made his first appearance in New York, playing at the Aeolian Hall. He won critical praise as "a violinist of considerable interest and promise." He played works by Bach, Bruch, Sarasate, Chopin and his own Legende. In 1972 the American Music Center awarded his a Letter of Distinction.

Pollikoff was born in Newark, New Jersey. From 15 to 19, the McDowell Club had sponsored his studies in Europe and New York.

References

External links
Letter of Distinction from the American Music Center, 1972
Article on Pollikoff and Music in our Time in Time, 27 April 1959

1904 births
Jewish classical musicians
Jewish violinists
American classical violinists
Male classical violinists
American male violinists
Jewish American musicians
1984 deaths
Musicians from Newark, New Jersey
20th-century classical violinists
Classical musicians from New York (state)
Classical musicians from New Jersey
20th-century American male musicians
20th-century American Jews
20th-century American violinists